Harley Swedler (born 1962) is an architect, artist, designer, and entrepreneur based in Paris and New York.

Biography
Harley Swedler was born in Ottawa, Canada, in 1962. Swedler  earned a Bachelor of Architecture degree from Carleton University in Ottawa. Upon completing his studies, in Canada and Italy, Swedler worked at the offices of Pasanella and Klein, where he was involved in the renovation of Joan Rivers' Manhattan pied-a-terre.  He completed his licensing requirements while working at Richard Meier and Partners Architects on projects in Europe and North America.  After becoming a New York State registered professional, Swedler opened his own design atelier in Tribeca.  He began creating functional art objects for private collectors, and his pieces were noted in The New York Times and international design magazines.  His work was acquired by the Jewish Museum for its permanent collection.  A line of housewares was later introduced under the Harley label, and was sold at the Guggenheim Museum shops, the Whitney Museum shops, Fred Segal, and Nordstroms.

Harley eventually relocated his studio to his Long Island home, which he designed.  The glass and steel JAM House was reviewed in Interior Design magazine and Martha Stewart Living.

Harley Swedler was invited to present a curated selection of his videos at Palais de Tokyo in Paris in 2019. During the DO DISTURB festival he simultaneously situated himself at the entrance to the museum, where he 'kissed' all arriving visitors in a large 'XO' installation (this performance work was based on an episode of The Partridge Family). Swedler's large scale work Personalasweiss was commissioned by The Jewish Museum Berlin for the exhibition Haut Ab. The installation featured three life-sized images of the artist laid bare with geo-political fig leaves - a reference to the ritual of circumcision in the three monotheistic religions. His extensive video project Dirty Movies is a collection of one hundred music videos, inspired by invincibility of youth in the face of vulnerability in aging. The videos have been exhibited in international venues and have been collected by private art enthusiasts. Swedler has served as the Director of Communications and External Affairs at the interdisciplinary design studio of Diller Scofidio + Renfro, where he worked on projects including the renovation and expansion of The Museum of Modern Art (MoMA), and The Shed in New York.

While volunteering his time as an architect for the Agahozo-Shalom Youth Village (ASYV) in Rwanda, Swedler wrote a blog detailing his experiences in East Africa.  In the course of writing a book about breast cancer, he became actively involved with Susan G. Komen for the Cure (SGK), a breast cancer advocacy and outreach organization partnered with the Joint Distribution Committee project in Rwanda. In 2008  Swedler was honored as the Susan G. Komen 'Co-Survivor' for his literary efforts in putting out a male perspective on the effects of breast cancer on women and their families.

Harley Swedler is an architect, designer, artist, filmmaker, writer, and culinary professional.  He lives between Paris and New York. A website devoted to his work details his ongoing projects. Harley Swedler is a member of La Maison des Artistes and Thanks for Nothing, in Paris, France.

References

External links
  Harley Swedler blog

Living people
1962 births
Canadian architects
Canadian bloggers